Santhosh Narayanan is an Indian composer and musician in the Tamil film industry.

Early life
Santhosh Narayanan was born in Tiruchirappalli, India. He is the younger of two children. He was educated at RSK Higher Secondary School, Tiruchirappalli. Santhosh Narayanan completed his B.E., Computer Science & Engineering at J. J. College of Engineering and Technology, Thiruchirapalli.  After completing his education, he worked as a recording engineer, arranger and programmer, before beginning to produce independent music and compose for films. He composed the music including two original songs for the Telugu short film Advaitham, He was also part of the contemporary folk music band "La Pongal" in which he performed in a few live shows in 2009.

Through Mani, Santhosh also got to work on a couple of Rahman soundtracks starting with Guru.

Career

2012–2013: Debut success

He made his debut as an independent music director in the 2012 Tamil film Attakathi directed by Pa. Ranjith. He got the opportunity through its producer   C. V. Kumar who saw him working in his studio. Santhosh composed a song in the Gaana genre for the film, "Aadi Pona Aavani", and gave a then-unknown Gana Bala, who had been singing gaana songs at funerals until then, the chance to sing it. Along with "Aadi Pona Aavani", a second gaana song, "Nadukadalula Kappala" was recorded for the film. Both songs went on to become popular, making Gana Bala a star, and were said to have brought back gaana to Tamil cinema. Sify wrote that the gaana songs were "one of the major highlight of the film" and Behindwoods called the Attakathi album an "experimental yet fresh attempt". Following Attakathi, he composed the music for the films Uyir Mozhi and Pizza, the directorial debuts of Raja and Karthik Subbaraj, respectively. All three albums, Attakathi, Uyir Mozhi and Pizza were recorded and mastered by Leon Zervos at Studios 301 in Sydney Australia; furthermore, the Sydney Symphony Orchestra had performed for the soundtrack of Pizza, which also saw Santhosh collaborating with Gana Bala again, albeit on a Blues number this time. For Uyir Mozhi, some of the songs Santhosh had scored for a private album were used by the director. Santhosh's work in Pizza was positively reviewed. According to Sify, Santhosh Narayanan's music was a "major plus" of the film, and IBN Live described the score as "splendid". The song "Mogathirai" from the soundtrack album was also listed by Indiaglitz.com in their Top songs from 2012 list. Behindwoods at the end of 2012 wrote, "Santosh Narayanan brought a different sound to Tamil cinema this year. Even his gaana tracks in Attakathi were freshly produced and the soundtrack of Pizza was eclectic to say the least". He also won accolades that year: the Jaya TV 2012 award for Sensational Debutant Music Director for Attakathi, and the Big Tamil Melody Award for Best Debut Music director for Pizza. He worked on the black comedy film Soodhu Kavvum directed by the  Director Nalan Kumarasamy next. Gana Bala was given a "gana-rap" in the film, "Kaasu Panam", which went on to become one of the most popular songs of the year. His work in the film earned him the Vijay Award for Best Background Score. His other releases of 2013 were Pizza 2: The Villa, a sequel to Pizza, and Billa Ranga, his first Telugu and only full-fledged Telugu project until date.

2014–2015

Santhosh Narayanan worked exclusively on Tamil films. He had four soundtracks released that year, the first being the album to the romantic drama Cuckoo. Cuckoo'''s soundtrack was highly appreciated by critics who called it an "alluring and immersive album" and "the best soundtrack that composer Santhosh Narayanan has produced yet". The song "Manasula Soora Kaathey" from the album reached number one position in the Tunes all India charts, while Outlook named it one of South India's top songs of the year. The score received equal praise with Baradwaj Rangan terming it as "great", IANS as "life-affirming", Rediff as "sensational" and Sify as "outstanding". The next release was Karthik Subbaraj's second directorial, Jigarthanda, which was promoted as a "musical gangster story". While Cuckoo featured live instrumentation, Santhosh Narayanan used electronic musical instruments for the recording in Jigarthanda, who recorded almost all the songs in a studio in Sydney, Australia for nearly two months. The soundtrack and score featured a melange and fusion of several genres, including Gangsta rap, folk, electro. His work was well received again; while The Times of India, in its album review, wrote that "Santhosh Narayanan shows, yet again, that he is one of those composers to watch out for — both for his new sounds and tunes", The Hindu's Baradwaj Rangan stated that "his flamboyant score imbues even the weaker scenes with a Tarantinoesque swagger". After Jigarthanda, he worked on the action-drama film Madras. The Hindu described his score as "excellent". The soundtrack to Enakkul Oruvan, the Tamil remake of the Kannada film Lucia, for which he had composed the score, was his final 2014 release. The album was also lauded by critics. Behindwoods named him the "most promising among the younger composers".

In 2015, he worked on 36 Vayadhinile, the Tamil remake of the Malayalam film How Old Are You. Upcoming projects of Santhosh Narayanan include the next films of directors Karthik Subbaraj and Nalan Kumarasamy. In 2016, he composed songs for Sudha Kongara's bilingual sports drama Irudhi Suttru(filmed simultaneously in Hindi as Saala Khadoos). The Hindi adaptation film, "Saala Khadoos" however did not feature background score by Santhosh as Rajkumar Hirani, the co-producer of the film brought in composers Sanjay Wandrekar and Atul Raninga who had worked with him in 3 Idiots and PK  to compose the background score. Kashmora to be directed by Gokul, and Manithan were his other noted released in 2016 apart from Kabali, the biggest Tamil project so far in his career. In 2016, a music critic from The Hindu labelled Narayanan as one of the three in "the new-age musical trio of Tamil cinema" alongside Sean Roldan and Pradeep Kumar.

 2016 

The year 2016 was one of the most packed years for Santhosh Narayanan. Six releases during the year including music compositions for Iruthi Suttru, Manithan, Kadhalum Kadanthu Pogum, Iraivi, Kabali, Kaashmora, Kodi.

In 2017, he composed for the Vijay-starrer Bairavaa. Santhosh's next release was as a guest composer, in the filmMeyaadha Maan, a production venture of his Karthik Subbaraj. In May 2017, Santhosh signed for Kaala, his second film for Superstar Rajinikanth. In 2018 he gave scored Karthik Subbarraj's silent thriller film Mercury and Vetrimaaran's Vada Chennai, the latter being Santhosh's 25th as a composer. In 2020 with new projects which were Kasada Thapara, Jeeva starrer Gypsy and Penguin.

 2021 
He was involved with Dulquer Salmaan's 2021 Malayalam film Salute, before being replaced by Jakes Bejoy. He also composed the soundtrack and film's score for Sarpatta Parambarai; It marked the composer's fifth consecutive film with Pa. Ranjith, since his and the director's debut film Attakathi (2012). According to Santhosh, he said that "the film is influenced by the aspects of Madras, as it is mostly about the descriptive and realistic portrayal of North Chennai, while the boxing culture during the 1970s also serve as the subplot". 
He worked with Maajja on independent music as Enjoy Enjami sung by Arivu, Dhee and himself which clocked 19 million views within one week of release making it the highest watched Tamil music video album and keeping now at 296 million views. Also on the music video Neeye Oli sung by rappers Shan Vincent de Paul, Navz-47 and himself. Neeye Oli also featured in Sarpatta Parambarai as the theme song. His upcoming releases are Anel Meley Pani Thuli, Gulu Gulu and Buffoon in Tamil, Dasara in Telugu and Pathonpatham Noottandu and Anweshippin Kandethum'' in Malayalam.

Discography

As solo composer

Television/Web Series

Television/Web Series

Additional themes only

As singer

References

 
 
 

Living people
Tamil film score composers
Musicians from Tiruchirappalli
1983 births
Tamil playback singers
Indian male playback singers
Indian male film score composers